Dragan Marinković "Maca" (born 17 March 1968) is a Bosnian actor and TV personality.

Widely known by his nickname Maca, though trained as an actor, Marinković is most notable for his outrageous personality showcased during his stints on reality television. In mid-2007, he was a contestant on the first season of Veliki brat VIP (the Serbian version of Celebrity Big Brother), making it all the way to the final day. In early 2010 he repeated the same on another reality contest Farma. He currently resides in Novi Sad with his family.

His biggest acting job is a role opposite Mirsad Tuka and Mira Furlan in the 2010 multiple award-winning Bosnian film The Abandoned.

Career

Acting
After graduating from the Academy of Performing Arts in Sarajevo, Maca experienced trouble breaking into the business. Initially only involved with acting through supporting parts on film and in theater, he could be seen in the occasional play on small Sarajevo stages such as Kamerni teatar 55. Later he got small parts in various international film productions depicting the Bosnian War where he played stock character portrayals of local "bad guys" - usually cartoonish Serbian soldiers and paramilitaries. Two most notable such gigs were his appearances in Hollywood productions Welcome to Sarajevo and Behind Enemy Lines.

However, more substantial parts in local productions eluded him and he eventually turned to TV presenting as his main career activity. After getting some prominence as a television personality in Sarajevo and the rest of Bosnia, he often complained in interviews about various acting clans as the reason for his lack of headway in the local cinematography.

After getting some prominence outside of Bosnia in 2007 as a result of Veliki brat VIP appearance, he also started getting more acting gigs such as the 7-episode engagement on Serbian TV series Agencija za SiS on TV Pink.

TV presenting
With his acting career stuck in a rut in the mid-2000s, Maca simultaneously started appearing on television hoping to gain more exposure. He became one of the many rotating hosts on the morning programme called Balkan.Net, simulcast live on three TV Pink stations throughout the Balkans. His off-the-cuff nature quickly made him stand out among the various hosts. Around the same time he was involved in Pile and Maca Show on Pink BH, which he co-hosted with Zoran "Pile" Radojković.

That exposure led to Maca getting a show of his own in October 2005 - the aptly named One Man Show - Niko kao ja on OBN television in Bosnia. Conceptualized as a free format with street bits and in-studio pieces such as wrestling with strippers in chocolate and turbo-folk performances, the show often bordered on vulgarity with profanity, sexual innuendo, and street lingo being the norm. Following the controversy that erupted after the episode that aired on New Year's Day 2006, the show was taken off the air.

From January 2007, Maca was back on TV in a remake of Ruski rulet quiz (aired in Serbia from September 2003 until July 2005 hosted by Irfan Mensur) for Bosnian market, airing on Pink BH.

Arguably, Maca's biggest break on television came in May 2007 when he was included among the contestants on the first season of Veliki brat VIP (Celebrity Big Brother). Being seen by a wide television audience outside of Bosnia for the first time, his wild personality and attitude were impossible to ignore as he became the most talked about housemate. Profanity-laced tirades directed at fellow housemates and compulsive scratching were just some of his behavioural quirks that marked his time on the show in which he ended up making it in the final two, only to be beaten by retired football player Saša Ćurčić.

With his public profile raised in Serbia as a result of the show, Maca started getting jobs there as well.

In early September 2008, Maca was announced as part of the hosting crew on another Emotion project - Operacija trijumf reality show that started in late September 2008. In addition to co-hosting the gala evenings alongside Milan Kalinić, Nikolina Pišek, and Ana Mihajlovski each Monday, he also co-hosted a live broadcast called Najgori od sve dece on Saturday nights with Marijana Mićić.

In February 2009 he entered the Veliki brat house again, this time on the Veliki Brat VIP All Stars edition. Staying true to his reputation and imposing personality, he had ego clashes with everyone from rapper Gru, over to Miki Đuričić, and finally even Milić Vukašinović. Maca also frequently groped and harassed model and former Miss Yugoslavia Tijana Stajšić who surprisingly seemed receptive to his aggressive sexual advances.

In early July 2009, Maca started shooting episodes for the Balkan version of the Distraction game show, hosted by him, and set to air in the fall 2009 in five countries (Serbia, Croatia, Bosnia, Macedonia, and Montenegro).

Other
In late September 2009 Maca opened a burek parlour (buregdžinica) called Burek.ba in Miloša Pocerca Street in Belgrade.

Controversy
The episode of Maca's One Man Show that aired on 1 January  2006 on OBN television caused a huge stir in Sarajevo, with particular outrage directed at the street bit at the Ciglane open market that had Maca paying out BAM 22 males loitering nearby (mostly a random assortment of drunks, homeless people, and Roma) on condition they grab random passing women by their behinds.

Even various public personalities voiced their displeasure, the most vocal of whom was Senad Hadžifejzović, influential news anchor on the rival Hayat station who even brought the issue up during his newscast. He was apparently so outraged that he had Maca's partner at the time Amra Redžić working on Hayat as a make-up person fired.

Soon, Maca and OBN television got sued for sexual harassment by Amela Dervišević, one of the random passers-by whose behind was grabbed on camera. At first Maca failed to show up for multiple court dates during late 2007. After eventually pleading "not guilty" on 16 January 2008, the court process began.

The verdict was finally delivered on 24 November 2008 and Maca was given a KM20,000 fine as well as a two-year probationary sentence, which if violated will become a 6-month prison term. The verdict was delivered on the day when he was hosting Operacija trijumf'''s ninth gala show, but he refused to comment.

On 6 December 2008 broadcast of Najgori od sve dece, Maca aroused more controversy as he reacted to a Puls'' magazine piece in which journalist Milica Crnogorac criticizes his presenting style. Maca said in live programme: "I'd like to use this opportunity to say hi to a certain Milica Crnogorac, some excuse for a journalist who thinks she has the right to spit on me and my colleagues. Listen to me, Milica, mind your own business or you'll end up like Petar Luković".

Filmography

Film

Television

References

External links
Official site

Interview with Dragan Marinković Maca

1968 births
Living people
Male actors from Sarajevo
20th-century Bosnia and Herzegovina male actors
21st-century Bosnia and Herzegovina male actors 
Bosnia and Herzegovina male actors
Big Brother (franchise) contestants